Aboubacar Guindo (born 30 May 1981, in Bamako) is a Malian former professional footballer who played as a striker.

He played on the professional level in Ligue 2 for ASOA Valence.

Guindo played for Mali at the 1997 FIFA U-17 World Championship in Egypt.

References

1981 births
Living people
Sportspeople from Bamako
Association football forwards
Malian footballers
Malian expatriate footballers
Expatriate footballers in France
Ligue 2 players
ASOA Valence players
Paris FC players
Pacy Ménilles RC players
ES Viry-Châtillon players
FC Aurillac Arpajon Cantal Auvergne players
FC Mantois 78 players
Malian expatriate sportspeople in France
21st-century Malian people